Pink ivory (Phyllogeiton zeyheri, syn. Berchemia zeyheri), also called purple ivory, red ivory, umnini or umgoloty, is an African hardwood used to make a variety of products (for example: billiard cues and knife handles). The pink ivory tree grows predominantly in Zimbabwe, Mozambique, Northern Botswana and South Africa. The tree is protected and sustainably maintained in South Africa, only felled by very limited permit. The wood is extremely hard, with a density of 990 g/dm3.

Pink ivory was the royal tree of the Zulu people and only members of the royal family were allowed to possess it until the Anglo-Zulu War of 1879. Before the Anglo-Zulu War, the Zulu king (and prior to 1818, Zulu chiefs) would possess a pink ivory knob kerry, a stick with one end a knob, and wear jewelry that were also made from pink ivory. According to rumor, non-royals who possessed the wood would summarily be put to death. After Zululand fell to the British and was separated into 13 separate "kinglets" in 1883, all vying to retake control of what was once theirs precedent to the onset of apartheid, the pink ivory wood became much less important a sign of control than genuine control could be.

The pink ivory tree produces a yellow, brownish, reddish, or purplish drupe fruit that is delicious to taste. Other parts of the tree have been used traditionally as remedies and medicines.

References

Rhamnaceae
Trees of South Africa
Flora of Zimbabwe
Flora of Mozambique
Ivory